"Winter Olympics" is an episode of the British comedy television series The Goodies. Written by The Goodies, with songs and music by Bill Oddie.

Plot
The Minister of Sport asks the Goodies to represent Britain at the forthcoming Winter Olympics. When they ask for directions to their training headquarters, the Minister gives them an unusual map (a tall thin cactus) to guide them. Riding their trandem, blindfolded, they follow the contours of their 'cactus map' to their destination, where they find their headquarters is a tiny shed in Bognor. Their sporting equipment is also very meagre and very old and unusual.

There is no room in the shed for both training benches and beds, and the Goodies discover that the benches double as beds. A massage is provided by mechanical means, which is very uncomfortable, and the oil for the massage is provided by oil cans with dark-coloured oil.

Tim learns to ski on two planks of wood, being towed, on the road, by a rope behind the Goodies trandem.

With another unusual 'map' (this time a kettle) to guide them, the Goodies travel to the British team's igloo quarters. When the Goodies arrive at the North Pole, where the Games are to be held, they are feeling extremely cold, but the sight of the beautiful Eskimo Nell warms them up. Meals are very unappetising and boring.

The Goodies are unsure how they would go in competition in the slippery and cold icy conditions, so they capture a butterfly and strap a sunlamp to it to give themselves a better chance. With the butterfly fluttering away, the steady beam of the sunlamp causes the ice and snow to melt. In the resultant extremely hot conditions, the competitors from other countries flounder, while the Goodies win many medals.

After the Goodies' triumphant return home, they find that extreme climatic changes have suddenly occurred, with unexpected results.

References

 "The Complete Goodies" — Robert Ross, B T Batsford, London, 2000
 "The Goodies Rule OK" — Robert Ross, Carlton Books Ltd, Sydney, 2006
 "From Fringe to Flying Circus — 'Celebrating a Unique Generation of Comedy 1960-1980'" — Roger Wilmut, Eyre Methuen Ltd, 1980
 "The Goodies Episode Summaries" — Brett Allender
 "The Goodies — Fact File" — Matthew K. Sharp
 "TV Heaven" — Jim Sangster & Paul Condon, HarperCollinsPublishers, London, 2005

External links
 

The Goodies (series 3) episodes
1973 British television episodes
Olympic Games in fiction
Television episodes set in the Arctic
Television episodes set in England